The Best of Matt Bianco is a compilation album by British band Matt Bianco. It was released in 1990 by Warner Elektra Atlantic Corp.

Track listing 

"Don't Blame It on That Girl" (Mark Fisher, Mark Reilly)
"Yeh Yeh" (Rodgers Grant, Jon Hendricks, Pat Patrick)
"Half a Minute" (Reilly, Kito Poncioni, Danny White)
"More Than I Can Bear" (Reilly, White)
"Sneaking Out the Back Door" (Reilly, White)
"Fire in the Blood" – 7" Version (Fisher, Reilly)
"Good Times" (Fisher, Reilly)
"Matt's Mood" (Reilly, White)
"Get Out of Your Lazy Bed" (Reilly, White)
"Wap Bam Boogie" (Fisher, Reilly)
"Dancing in the Street" (Fisher, Reilly)
"Whose Side Are You On?" (Reilly, White)
"Say It's Not Too Late" (Fisher, Reilly)
"Nervous" (Fisher, Reilly)
"We've Got the Mood – Matt's Mood '90" (Reilly, White)
"Fire in the Blood" – 12" Version (Reilly, White)

Charts

References

1990 greatest hits albums
East West Records compilation albums
Matt Bianco albums